Atricholaelaps is a genus of mites in the family Laelapidae.

Species
 Atricholaelaps reithrodontis (Ewing, 1925)

References

Laelapidae